The 2022 Silverstone Formula 3 round was a motor racing event held on 2 and 3 July 2022 at the Silverstone Circuit, Silverstone, United Kingdom. It was the fourth round of the 2022 FIA Formula 3 Championship, and was held in support of the 2022 British Grand Prix.

Driver changes 
Multiple driver changes took place for the fourth round at the Silverstone Circuit. On the weekend before the Silverstone round, Trident confirmed that Jonny Edgar would return to the series after missing the previous two rounds following Crohn's disease he sustained on early April 2022. Zdeněk Chovanec also returned to the championship after last competing at the 2021 Sochi Formula 3 round, driving for Charouz Racing System.

Following the 2022 Russian invasion of Ukraine, MP Motorsport driver Alexander Smolyar was denied of getting a visa for the entry into the United Kingdom. Hence, he was not able to take part at the fourth round in Silverstone and was then replaced by Romanian driver Filip Ugran, who returned to the series after competing in the previous season.

Classification

Qualifying
Rookie and Carlin driver Zak O'Sullivan took his maiden Formula 3 pole position on home soil ahead of Arthur Leclerc and Zane Maloney.

Sprint race 

Notes:
 – Rafael Villagómez received a five-second time penalty for lining up on the grid outside of the confines of his grid box, which is a breach of Article 37.9 of the FIA Formula 3 Sporting Regulations. Both Charouz drivers László Tóth and Zdeněk Chovanec received the same penalty, but the penalties became invalid as they eventually retired from the Sprint Race.

Feature race 

Notes:
 – Brad Benavides and Kush Maini both received a five-second time penalty for exceeding track limits multiple times.
 – Zdeněk Chovanec received a three-place grid penalty for causing a collision with László Tóth in the Sprint race.
 – Grégoire Saucy received a ten-second time penalty for causing a collision with Roman Staněk.

Standings after the event 

Drivers' Championship standings

Teams' Championship standings

 Note: Only the top five positions are included for both sets of standings.

See also 
 2022 British Grand Prix
 2022 Silverstone Formula 2 round

Notes

References

External links 
 Official website

|- style="text-align:center"
|width="35%"|Previous race:
|width="30%"|FIA Formula 3 Championship2022 season
|width="40%"|Next race:

Silverstone
SIlverstone Formula 3
Silverstone Formula 3